The Chicago Trolley & Double Decker Co., runs the original hop on hop off tour and private rental service based in Chicago, Illinois, United States. It is the largest tour operator in the Chicago area, with a fleet of 26 double-decker buses and 39 trolleys.

They were the only transportation and managed the World Series Parade for the 2016 Chicago Cubs, the World Series Parade for the 2005 Chicago White Sox, and all three Stanley Cup Parades for the Chicago Blackhawks.

The company was founded in 1994 with a small fleet of 8 trolleys. It has grown to be a Chicago tourist attraction. Corporations and department stores in the city use Chicago Trolley to promote sales.  In 2007, it ranked third (behind Navy Pier and Millennium Park) in terms of the number of tourists it hosted.

Chicago Trolley & Double Decker Co is a member of Coach USA.

Chicago Trolley and Double Decker Company's last day of operation is December 31, 2019.

References

See also
Coach USA

Transportation in Chicago
Companies based in Chicago
Transport companies established in 1993
Transport companies disestablished in 2019
Travel and holiday companies of the United States